Qaraxanlı or Qaraxanli or Karakhanly may refer to:
 Qaraxanlı, Aghjabadi, Azerbaijan
 Qaraxanlı, Tovuz, Azerbaijan